Dobyns is a surname. Notable people with the surname include:

Emery Dobyns, American record producer
Henry F. Dobyns (1925–2009), American anthropologist
Jay Dobyns (born 1961), American special agent
John P. Dobyns (born 1944), American politician
Lee Dobyns (born c. 1935), American football coach
Lloyd Dobyns (born 1936), American news anchor
Stephen Dobyns (born 1941), American poet and novelist
Winifred Starr Dobyns (1886–1963), American suffragist and landscape designer